Seán Curran (born 15 September 1991) is an Irish hurler who currently plays for the Tipperary senior team. He made his senior debut during the 2012 National League.

Curran was part of the Tipperary Senior hurling team panel in 2016, and made his Championship debut on 22 May 2016 against Cork in the Munster Championship quarter-final win, starting at right half forward in the 0-22 to 0-13 win.

Honours
All-Ireland Senior Hurling Championship (1): 2016
Munster Senior Hurling Championship (2): 2012, 2016

References

External links
Tipperary Player Profile
Hogan Stand Interview

1991 births
Living people
Mullinahone hurlers
Tipperary inter-county hurlers